Conops strigatus is a species of fly from the genus Conops in the family Conopidae. Their larvae are endoparasites of bees and wasps. The fly is scarce in the United Kingdom.

References

External links
 

Parasites of bees
Parasitic flies
Conopidae
Insects described in 1824
Muscomorph flies of Europe
Endoparasites